Valentina Zenere  (born 15 January 1997) is an Argentine actress, model and singer known for her portrayal of Ámbar Smith in the Disney Channel series Soy Luna and Juacas, as well as for her portrayal of Alai Inchausti in the Argentine telenovela Casi Ángeles. Since 2022, she plays Isadora Artiñán on the Netflix series Elite.

Life and career 

Zenere started working on television in various advertisements at a young age while also attending high school, which she graduated from in 2014.

In 2010, she was added to the main cast of the successful telenovela Casi Ángeles, landing the role of Alai Inchausti. Afterwards, she took various little roles on theatre and television. Most notable was her appearance in a musical production of Les Misérables.

In 2016, Zenere received international attention when the Disney Channel original series Soy Luna aired. Her portrayal of the antagonist Ámbar Smith received critical as well as public acclaim. She reprised her role as Ámbar in the Brazilian Disney Channel series Juacas. She maintains close relationships to many of her co-stars, including Eugenia Suárez, Michael Ronda, Carolina Kopelioff, Gastón Vietto, Malena Ratner, and Oriana Sabatini.

In 2019, Zenere protagonized Michael Ronda's music video La Diva de la Escuela.

She was cast as a main character of the fifth season of the successful Spanish Netflix series Cable Girls, airing in 2020. She was launched into internation al fame for her portrayal of "Isadora" in Netflix's critically acclaimed crime show "Elite".

Zenere currently resides in Madrid, Spain.

Discography

Singles

As lead artist

Other appearances

Filmography

Music videos

Awards and nominations

References

External links 
 
 

1997 births
21st-century Argentine actresses
Argentine television actresses
Argentine telenovela actresses
Argentine child actresses
Argentine female models
Actresses from Buenos Aires
Living people